A Marine expeditionary unit (MEU, pronounced as one syllable "" IPA)  is the smallest air-ground task force (MAGTF) in the United States Fleet Marine Force. Each MEU is an expeditionary quick reaction force, deployed and ready for immediate response to any crisis, whether it be natural disaster or combat mission. Marine amphibious unit (MAU) was the name used until the late 1980s.

A MEU normally is composed of
 a reinforced USMC infantry battalion (designated as a Battalion Landing Team) as the ground combat element
 a composite medium tiltrotor squadron forming the aviation combat element
 a combat logistics battalion providing the logistics combat element
 a company-size command element serving as the MEU headquarters group.

Troop strength of a MEU is about 2,200 (normal and peacetime) to 4,400 (mobilization and wartime). A MEU is usually commanded by a colonel, and is deployed from amphibious assault ships. Currently, a MEU embarks personnel and equipment on the amphibious warfare ships of an expeditionary strike group (ESG), which also includes escort warships and submarines to protect them from air, surface, and submarine threats. For further protection and strong air support, an ESG is often deployed along with one or more carrier strike groups.

Attributes

The MEU is unique in that its air and ground combat elements are combined with a logistics combat element under one commander; other services do not unite the command of air and ground forces until much higher command levels.

The MEU's ground combat element also combines artillery, light armor, and tanks at a much lower level than was common in the Army until the development of the brigade combat team early in the War on Terror, with a similar concept, the combat command, being utilized in World War II.

This air-ground task force concept is designed to thoroughly exploit the combat power inherent in air and ground assets by closely integrating them into a single force. The MEU brings all the supplies and logistical support it needs to sustain itself for quick mission accomplishment or to pave the way for any follow-up forces. This self-sustainment allows more flexibility in disposition and operations of forces, and allows the MEU to initiate operations sooner and let support catch up later, without having to wait for external logistical support to begin a mission. Deployments on U.S. Navy amphibious assault ships allows MEUs to seabase around the globe, ready for deployment at short notice.

A typical MEU has approximately 2,200 members, including navy sailors. It is equipped with:

Many types of equipment are, or will soon, undergo a transitory phase as they are replaced. Some examples include the Amphibious Combat Vehicle replacing the AAV-7, the F-35 Lightning II replacing the AV-8B Harrier, and the CH-53K King Stallion replacing the CH-53E.

Elements

Ground combat element

The ground combat element (GCE) is based on the battalion landing team (BLT), an infantry battalion reinforced with an artillery battery, amphibious assault vehicle platoon, combat engineer platoon, light armored reconnaissance company, reconnaissance platoon, and other units as the mission and circumstances require. The total strength is approximately 1,100 members, including Navy sailors.

The Maritime Special Purpose Force is a subgroup of the MEU, formed for low-profile missions. The MSPF force consists of four elements: an assault platoon (a direct action platoon augmented from Force Recon), a security platoon (a selected infantry platoon from the battalion landing team), reconnaissance and surveillance assets, and a headquarters section. The total strength is approximately 350 members, including Navy sailors.

Aviation combat element
The aviation combat element (ACE) is a USMC composite squadron (reinforced) composed of a medium tiltrotor squadron augmented with detachments of heavy, light, and attack helicopters, one detachment of amphibious flight-deck-capable jets, and a Marine air control group detachment with tactical air command, air traffic control, direct air support, and anti-aircraft assets, as well as wing headquarters, wing communications, and wing support squadron personnel. Total strength is approximately 600 troops.

Logistics combat element
The logistics combat element (LCE) (formerly combat service support element or CSSE) is based on the MEU combat logistics battalion (CLB) (formerly MEU service support group or MSSG).  It contains all the logistics specialists and equipment necessary for the MEU to support and sustain itself for up to 15 days in an austere expeditionary environment. It includes service support (postal and disbursing), medical, dental, intermediate maintenance, intermediate supply (consumables and secondary reparable), transportation (distribution and landing support), explosive ordnance disposal, utilities production and distribution, bulk fuels, internal communications, and various other technical experts. It consists of approximately 300 members, including Navy sailors.

Command element
The command element (CE), which includes the MEU commander and his supporting staff, provides command and control over the other three elements. It includes specialized detachments for air naval gunfire liaison, reconnaissance,  surveillance, specialized communications, radio reconnaissance (SIGINT), electronic warfare, Marine Corps Intelligence and counterintelligence, law enforcement, and public affairs missions.  The overall strength is about 200 members, including Navy sailors.

Expeditionary strike group
Recently, MEUs have been deployed within an expeditionary strike group (ESG) in the Mediterranean, the Western Pacific, and periodically, the Atlantic and Indian Oceans. An ESG is typically composed of three amphibious ships that embark the necessary troops and equipment and are escorted by a guided missile cruiser (CG) and guided missile destroyers (DDG) and submarine (SSN) support.

Before the ESG, MEUs were typically deployed as part of an amphibious ready group (ARG).

The MEU cycle

MEUs maintain their subordinate elements in fifteen month cycles: nine months stateside (with six set aside for training), and a six-month deployment aboard ship. These cycles ensure that at least two of the seven MEUs are deployed forward at any given time.

Interim or buildup period: Upon completion of a deployment, the MEU remains "special operations capable" for approximately one month, prepared to respond to events around the world. They are not, however, considered a special operations unit by the Department of Defense. The MEU then releases its major subordinate elements (MSEs), retaining only its command element.  This period provides the command element a chance to rotate select personnel and begin planning for the addition of newly assigned MSEs and “work-up” training.  When the MSEs are received, the MEU begins six months of intense pre-deployment training.

Work-up period: Training during the six-month work-up period is often referred to as "crawl, walk, run". Marines and sailors progress through curriculum and exercises that teach individual, small unit, and unit tactics while integrating the separate MEU elements into a cohesive, flexible, and powerful force.  The work-up period includes training in many combat and noncombat skills, to include:
 urban sniper
 mechanized and motorized raids
 non-combatant evacuation operations
 humanitarian assistance
 mass casualty
 scout swimmer
 jungle and/or mountain warfare
 riot control

Exercises conducted during the work-up period can include:
 Amphibious squadron—MEU integration training (PMINT)
 Realistic urban training exercise (RUT), formerly training in an urban environment exercise (TRUEX)
 Expeditionary strike group exercise (ESGEX)
 Special operations capable certification exercise (CERTEX or SOCCEX); prior to deployment, the MEU receives certification as special operations capable and then referred to as a "MEU(SOC)".

Deployment: Following the work-up period, the MEU deploys for six months in support of geographic combatant commanders. During this time, the MEU is a forward-deployed, self-sustaining force that combatant commanders can direct to accomplish a variety of special operations and conventional missions.

The missions may include:
 Conventional operations (amphibious assaults and raids)
 Tactical recovery of aircraft and personnel (TRAP)
 Humanitarian assistance operations (HAO)
 Noncombatant evacuation operations (NEO)
 Security operations.

List of MEUs

West Coast MEUs
West Coast MEUs fall under I Marine Expeditionary Force, and their main area of operations includes the western Pacific and Indian oceans (to include the Persian Gulf).

East Coast MEUs
East Coast MEUs fall under II Marine Expeditionary Force and maintain presence in the Atlantic Ocean and Mediterranean Sea.

Japan MEU
The 31st MEU is the only permanently forward-deployed MEU, maintaining a presence in the Pacific Ocean at all times as part of III Marine Expeditionary Force.

See also
 Marine expeditionary unit (special operations capable)
 Organization of the United States Marine Corps
 Regimental combat team

References

External links 

MEU
United States Marine Corps organization